Three Men in the Snow (German: Drei Männer im Schnee) is a 1974 German comedy film directed by Alfred Vohrer and starring Klaus Schwarzkopf, Roberto Blanco and Thomas Fritsch. It is an adaptation of the novel of the same title by Erich Kästner.

Plot
The wealthy and eccentric Tobler, a Geheimrat and owner of various businesses, enters and wins a competition started by one of his businesses.  Using the pseudonym, Schlüter,  he wins the second prize: a ten-day stay at the luxurious Grand Hotel in Bruckbeuren in the Alps.

The first prize is won by Dr. Fritz Hagedorn, an unemployed copywriter, who lives with his widowed mother and scrapes by on occasional work.

Before claiming the prize, Tobler transforms himself into Schlüter and assumes the persona of a poor man.  His intention is to carry out a sociological study.  Tobler buys old, worn-out, tattered clothes, and manages to pass himself off as destitute.  However, as a Geheimrat, he is both practical and pragmatic, and seeks to assure that he still retains access to his everyday luxuries. Thus, he orders his butler, Johann Kesselhut, to take accommodations at same hotel acting as a wealthy man and forbidden to recognize his master.

Tobler's daughter Hilde does not like the idea, the arrangements, and these plans.   She shares her unease with their longtime housekeeper, frau Kunkel, and they decide that Hilde should warn the management of the hotel of her father's plan.   But, as a comedy as this is, when Hilde phones the hotel's management, the faulty telephone lines scramble the message.  The hotel's management therefore considers the unemployed and destitute copywriter Dr. Hagedorn, the first prize winner, as the wealthy man living in disguise and decide to treat him lavishly.  Schlüter, who looks and acts poor, must sleep in a small attic room, without heating, harassed by the staff and used for occasional work.  Kesselhut tries to help as much as he can, and ultimately after a few days, decides to inform Hilde.  Hagedorn, Schlüter, and Kesselhut nevertheless bond with each other, and Hagedorn and Schlüter become friendly: a young man unaccustomed to luxury shares what he has with the poor, destitute old man.

When Hilde learns how her father is treated, she immediately travels to the hotel in Bruckbeuren with frau Kunkel acting as her aunt.   At the Grand Hotel, she is shocked to experience how her father is mistreated.  And, she falls in love with Hagedorn, not knowing that he also has a “secret”: poverty.  The romance between Hilde and Hagedorn blossoms rapidly to the point that they are planning to marry.  Yet, after a few additional days Tobler becomes so disgusted with the daily harassment by the hotel that he cannot take it anymore and rapidly returns to Berlin with his daughter, his butler, and the housekeeper.  The sudden departure, with no prior notice or information, leaves Hagedorn confused and saddened.

The lovelorn and depressed Hagedorn returns to Berlin to search for Hilde.  Not knowing her true name, he looks for the Schlüter’s.  That search is obviously unsuccessful. And, one day to Hagedorn's surprise, he and his mother are invited by to them unknown Tobler for supper.

When they arrive, the whole drama unfolds: the friendship forged between Tobler, Hagedorn, and Kasselhut strengthens. Hilde identifies herself as Tobler's daughter.  Tobler then learns that he already owns the grand hotel - he purchased it and sacked management promptly.

Themes
The story is about male bonding and the comedy of errors cutting across socio-economic lines in the aftermath of the Great Depression, and the rise of the Nazism, in Germany.  This book is clearly very apolitical.  Kästner was not a favorite of the Nazi cultural elite.  His few novels and works he authored at that time, reflect an increasing distance from the  day-to-day changes in the public discourse.  Throughout the predictable story, Kästner infuses warm humor and creates unusually realistic characters.

Cast
 Klaus Schwarzkopf as Otto Tobler 
 Roberto Blanco as Titus 
 Thomas Fritsch as Boris Dorfmeister  
 Susanne Beck as Susanne Tobler  
 Grit Boettcher as Frau Casparius  
 Lina Carstens as Frau Tobler  
 Elisabeth Volkmann as Frau Mallebré  
 Herbert Fleischmann as Zenkel  
 Ingrid Steeger as Gundula von Wolzogen  
 Fritz Tillmann as Kühne  
 Gisela Uhlen as Frau von Wolzogen  
 Klaus Grünberg as Ferry  
 Franz Muxeneder as Kommissar 
 Rainer Basedow as Kellner  
 Dieter Augustin as Barmann  
 Max Strecker as Eduard Schulze  
 Ursula Reit as Wondraschek, Telefonistin  
 Benno Hoffmann as Leo Plotte 
 Bruno W. Pantel as Richter  
 Ulrich Beiger as Prosecutor
 Joachim Hackethal as Mann in Kneipe  
 Rolf Castell as Anton

See also 
 A Rare Bird (1935)
 Three Men in the Snow (1936)
 Paradise for Three (1938)
 Three Men in the Snow (1955)

References

Bibliography 
 Bock, Hans-Michael & Bergfelder, Tim. The Concise CineGraph. Encyclopedia of German Cinema. Berghahn Books, 2009.

External links 
 

1974 films
1974 comedy films
German comedy films
West German films
1970s German-language films
Films directed by Alfred Vohrer
Constantin Film films
Films based on works by Erich Kästner
Remakes of French films
Films set in hotels
Films set in the Alps
Skiing films
1970s German films